Lyakhov or Liakhov (Russian or Ukrainian: Ляхов) is a Russian masculine surname, its feminine counterpart is Lyakhova or Liakhova. Notable people with the surname include:

Ivan Lyakhov (died c. 1800), Russian explorer
Olha Lyakhova (born 1992), Ukrainian middle-distance runner
Sergey Lyakhov (born 1968), Russian discus thrower
Vladimir Liakhov (1869–1919), Russian military commander
Vladimir Lyakhov (1941–2018), Russian cosmonaut
Yuliya Lyakhova (born 1977), Russian high jumper

See also
Lyakhovsky

Russian-language surnames